The 4th season of Jak oni śpiewają, the Polish edition of Soapstar Superstar, started on September 6, 2008 and ended on December 6, 2008. It was broadcast by Polsat. Joanna Liszowska and Krzysztof Ibisz as the hosts, and the judges were: Edyta Górniak, Elżbieta Zapendowska and Rudi Schuberth.

Stars

Guest Performances

Scores

Red numbers indicate the lowest score for each week.
Green numbers indicate the highest score for each week.
 indicates the star eliminated that week.
 indicates the returning stars that finished in the bottom two.
 indicates the star who has got immunitet
 indicates the star withdrew.

The Best Score (6.0)

Song Chart

 Not scored
 Highest scoring dance
 Lowest scoring dance

4
2008 Polish television seasons